Carlos Costa was the defending champion, but lost in the first round to Gastón Etlis.

Thomas Muster won the title by defeating Andrea Gaudenzi 6–2, 6–0 in the final.

Seeds

Draw

Finals

Top half

Bottom half

References

External links
 Official results archive (ATP)
 Official results archive (ITF)

San Marino CEPU Open
1995 ATP Tour